Big Point is an unincorporated community and census-designated place (CDP) in Jackson County, Mississippi, United States. It is part of the Pascagoula, Mississippi Metropolitan Statistical Area. Per the 2020 Census, the population was 618.

History
A post office operated under the name Bigpoint from 1894 to 1942.

Geography 
Big Point is located in northeastern Jackson County at  (30.586925, -88.481968). Mississippi Highway 613 passes through the community, leading north  to Hurley and southwest  to Escatawpa.

Demographics

2020 census

Note: the US Census treats Hispanic/Latino as an ethnic category. This table excludes Latinos from the racial categories and assigns them to a separate category. Hispanics/Latinos can be of any race.

2000 Census
As of the census of 2000, there were 115 people, 41 households, and 38 families residing in the CDP. The population density was 1,059.0 people per square mile (403.7/km2). There were 42 housing units at an average density of 386.8/sq mi (147.4/km2). The racial makeup of the CDP was 99.13% White, and 0.87% from two or more races.

There were 41 households, out of which 41.5% had children under the age of 18 living with them, 85.4% were married couples living together, 9.8% had a female householder with no husband present, and 4.9% were non-families. 4.9% of all households were made up of individuals, and none had someone living alone who was 65 years of age or older. The average household size was 2.80 and the average family size was 2.90.

In the CDP, the population was spread out, with 25.2% under the age of 18, 9.6% from 18 to 24, 30.4% from 25 to 44, 21.7% from 45 to 64, and 13.0% who were 65 years of age or older. The median age was 38 years. For every 100 females, there were 76.9 males. For every 100 females age 18 and over, there were 75.5 males.

The median income for a household in the CDP was $30,125, and the median income for a family was $30,125. Males had a median income of $22,361 versus $0 for females. The per capita income for the CDP was $10,243. None of the population and none of the families were below the poverty line.

Education 
Big Point is served by the Jackson County School District. It includes two elementary schools, one middle school, and one high school. Students in Big Point attend schools in Hurley, Mississippi.

Elementary schools 
 East Central Lower Elementary School
 East Central Upper Elementary School

Middle school 
 East Central Middle School

High school 
 East Central High School

References 

Census-designated places in Jackson County, Mississippi
Census-designated places in Mississippi
Pascagoula metropolitan area